Ibrahima Idrissou (born 1940) is a Beninese sprinter. He competed in the men's 400 metres at the 1972 Summer Olympics.

References

1940 births
Living people
Athletes (track and field) at the 1972 Summer Olympics
Beninese male sprinters
Olympic athletes of Benin
Place of birth missing (living people)
Candidates for President of Benin